Antenna 3 is an Italian regional television channel of Veneto owned by TV Vision. It transmits a light entertainment program: movies, news and weather bulletins on LCN 13.

Other channels of own group are Free TV and Ada Channel.

Programs in italian 
A Marenda
X news
Oasi di Salute
La Piazza
Meteo
Parola alla Difesa
Parliamone con Kira

Staff
Luigi Bacialli
Ferdinando Avarino

References

External links 
Official Site 

Television channels in Italy
Television channels and stations established in 1978
Free-to-air
Italian-language television networks